Calw (previously pronounced  and sometimes spelled Kalb accordingly) is a town in the middle of Baden-Württemberg in the south of Germany, capital and largest town of the district Calw. It has the status of a große Kreisstadt.

Geography

Location
The historic centre lies west of the river. The newer parts of town have developed on the surrounding slopes. The following streams also exist within the town: the Tälesbach, Ziegelbach, Wurstbrunnenbach, Schießbach, Schlittenbach und Schweinbach. In the northern part of the town, on the western slope of the Nagold valley is the cave known as the Bruderhöhle.

Neighbouring Communities
The following towns and communities (Gemeinden) border on the town of Calw (clockwise, from the north): Bad Liebenzell, Althengstett, Gechingen, Wildberg, Neubulach, Bad Teinach-Zavelstein, Neuweiler, Bad Wildbad and Oberreichenbach (all in the Calw district).

Subdivisions
Calw has 13 subdivisions known as Stadtteile (quarters or neighborhoods):  Altburg, Oberriedt, Speßhardt, Spindlershof, Weltenschwann, Calw, Alzenberg, Heumaden, Wimberg, Hirsau, Ernstmühl, Holzbronn und Stammheim. The subdivision known as Calw corresponds to the historic town centre. The following subdivisions are centered on historic villages: Altburg, Alzenberg, Hirsau, Holzbronn, and Stammheim.

History 
Calw was first mentioned in records in 1037. In the Middle Ages, Calw was an important commercial town, especially in the cloth and leather trades. In 1345, Calw became part of Württemberg, and by the 16th century, it had become the summer residence of the Dukes of Württemberg. In the 18th century, Calw flourished from the lumber trade and rafting of timber on the river Nagold.

In 1945, a small subcamp of Natzweiler-Struthof concentration camp, where parts for aircraft were assembled by female Jewish forced laborers, was located here.

After the World War II, Calw fell into the French zone of occupation and thus came to the newly founded state of Württemberg-Hohenzollern in 1947. In 1952, the provisional post-war state in the administrative region of South Württemberg-Hohenzollern merged and has since belonged to the new state of Baden-Württemberg.

The most prominent resident of Calw was the author and Nobel prize winner Hermann Hesse.

The district reform of 1 January 1973 gave the district of Calw its current size. It became a part of the newly founded Northern Black Forest Region, which itself was assigned to the administrative region of Karlsruhe. On 1 January 1975, Calw was combined with the communities of Altburg, Hirsau and Stammheim into the town of Calw-Hirsau. On 1 January 1976, the combined municipality was renamed as Calw.

Religious History

Calw was originally part of the Roman Catholic Diocese of Speyer. From 1534, in Calw as in the rest of the Duchy of Württemberg, the Reformation took force. In 1555, Calw became the seat of a deanery, which still exists today. The Deanery of Calw encompasses 43 congregations of the Evangelical-Lutheran Church in Württemberg. In the town of Calw there is the greater congregation of Calw, comprising the town-centre congregation (Calw Stadtkirche), the Bergkirche congregation of Wimberg/Alzenberg, and the Versöhnungskirche congregation of Heumaden, of which the last two came into existence only after the arrival of Heimatvertriebene after World War II. There are also congregations in the villages of Altburg, Hirsau, Holzbronn und Stammheim.

There is also a congregation of the United Methodist Church, an independent Protestant church, in Calw.

In the 19th century, Catholics returned to Calw. In 1885–1886, they founded the parish of St. Josef, which later became the seat of a deanery within the diocese of Rottenburg (today Rottenburg-Stuttgart). The parish of St. Josef covers the entire territory of the town as well as several surrounding communities.

A congregation of Seventh-day Adventists was founded in Calw in 1914.

Population
Populations within the town limits of Calw as defined for each date; the numbers are estimates or census results of the respective statistical agencies (by primary residence):

Data sources: census results (¹) or data from statistical offices

Politics

Municipal council 
Since the municipal elections of 7 June 2009 the municipal council of Calw has had a total of thirty members (previously there were only twenty-seven). The Lord Mayor (in German "Oberbürgermeister") has a votes and acts as the chairperson of the council. The municipal election of 25 May 2014 yielded these results:

Mayor 
By the 15th century, Calw had an electoral system that chose a new mayor (Bürgermeister) every two years. Proof exists for a council as far back as 1453. Since its elevation to the rank of a große Kreisstadt in 1976, the mayor has carried the title of Oberbürgermeister (Lord Mayor). An elected deputy mayor carries the title Bürgermeister.

Mayors and Lord Mayors 

 1799–1802: Ernst Friedrich Wagner
 1802–1809: Ernst Bernhard Wagner
 1809–1817: Johann Gottfried Konrad und Johann Naschold
 1817–1820: Carl Friedrich von Gärtner
 1820–1826: Johann Jakob Hess
 1826–1835: Johann Friedrich Dreiß
 1835–1884: Christian Friedrich Schuldt
 1884–1902: Hermann Haffner
 1902–1918: Eduard Conz
 1918–1946: Otto Göhner
 1946–1948: Oskar Blessing
 1948–1965: Reinhold Seeber
 1965–1991: Karl-Heinz Lehmann
 1991–1998: Herbert Karl
 1999–2003: Werner Spec (no party)
 2003–2011: Manfred Dunst (Free Voters)
 2011–2019: Ralf Eggert (no party)
 since 2019: Florian Kling (SPD)

Coat of Arms
The coat of arms of the town of Calw shows a red lion with a blue tongue and blue crown standing atop a blue hill with three ridges, all against a golden background. The town flag is red-gold. The lion on the three-ridged hill is the coat of arms of the counts of Calw, the former lords of the town. The coat of arms has been used for centuries and was reapproved for use by the state government when the town was expanded in 1976.

Economy
More than 8,000 people are employed in Calw, of which more than 5,200 work in the service sector and around 2,700 in the goods-producing sector.

Transport
Calw is served by Bundesstraßen (federal highways) 295, 296 und 463. Climbing out of the Nagold valley toward Stuttgart, Bundesstraße 296 has two lanes. This 2.7 km section thereby makes it possible to pass slower vehicles in two switchbacks.

The Nagold Valley Railway, which runs from Pforzheim to Hochdorf in Nagold, has two stops in Calw: the new Calw Station, which is adjacent to the central bus station, as well as a stop in Hirsau. The former Calw Station, which stood outside the town centre, was removed from service. The imposing station hall has been converted to other uses. It was formerly a connecting station for the Black Forest Railway to Stuttgart, whose western extension to Calw was closed in 1988. Since the purchase by Calw District in 1994 of the closed railway section to Weil der Stadt, the district has been pushing for a restoration of service as part of the Hermann Hesse Railway project.

Several bus lines provide public transportation. Buses of the agencies Regional Bus Stuttgart, Däuble Reisen, Bolz Reisen, and SüdwestBus offer connections to Unterreichenbach, Böblingen, Sindelfingen and Weil der Stadt (Regional Bus Stuttgart) as well as to Herrenberg (Däuble Reisen).

Government and Military
Calw is the seat of the district council of Calw District. There is also a tax office a local court, which belongs to the judicial districts of the state court Tübingen and of the superior state court of Stuttgart.

The Kommando Spezialkräfte (Special Forces Command) of the Bundeswehr (German Armed Forces) has been stationed since 1996 in the Graf Zeppelin Barracks near Heumaden in Calw.

Culture, Art, and Tourism 
Calw has a small historic centre that was largely untouched by the last war. Many guests visit the town's marketplace and the Nikolausbrücke (a historic bridge). Calw has begun catering to the tourist trade, with numerous shops, restaurants, bistros and ice-cream parlours.

In the 1970s part of the historic centre was replaced with a shopping centre. Soon after, the town centre was closed off and established as a pedestrian zone. Buildings with exposed concrete (bus station, parking garage) have marked the part of the town centre facing the Nagold for years. A shopping centre built around 2000 borders the historic centre to the north.

One of the cultural high points of the calendar in Calw is the Calw Hermann Hesse Prize. Every other year it honors literary journals and translators that have focused on the work of Hermann Hesse. In the Hermann Hesse Colloquium, current issues having to do with Hermann Hesse are discussed in Calw by international experts. Every year in the Benedictine ruins of the Monastery of St. Peter und Paul the theatre festival "Calwer Klostersommer in Hirsau" (Calw Monastery Summer in Hirsau) takes place. This replaced the Klosterspiele Hirsau (Monastery Plays of Hirsau), which were rich in tradition. Hermann Hesse's Gerbersau stories provide the material for the yearly "Gerbersauer Lesesommer“ (Gerbersau Reading Summer). Stories and anecdotes are read from more than three dozen stories and reflections of Hermann Hesse about life in Gerbersau, his literary pseudonym for Calw. A feature of the reading series is the frequent use of settings from Hesse's life. A cultural strength of the Hesse Town is music; worth mentioning are the Aurelius-Sängerknaben (Aurelius Boys' Choir), whose fame extends far beyond the borders of Baden-Württemberg. Further musical features include concert series in the Evangelical Lutheran Stadtkirche (Town Church) and in the St. Aurelius Church.

Notable people 
 Johannes Valentinus Andreae (1586–1654), clergyman
  (1906–1990), district administrator in Öhringen
 Joseph Gärtner (1732–1791), botanist
 August Friedrich Gfrörer (1803–1861), historian and deputy of the Frankfurt National Assembly
 Martin Haug (1895–1983), Protestant theologian and regional bishop of the Evangelical Landeskirche in Württemberg
 Hermann Gundert (1814-1893), prominent Indologist & translator of Malayalam bible, Grandfather of Hermann Hesse
 Hermann Hesse (1877–1962), German-born Swiss author, Nobel Prize in Literature 1946
 Frank Hölzle (born 1968), professor of oral, maxillofacial and facial surgery
 Peter Lehmann (born 1950), social scientist, honorary doctor of the Aristotle University of Thessaloniki, Greece, Knight of the Order of Merit of the Federal Republic of Germany
 Jörg Lutz (born 1963), mayor of Lörrach
 Hans Mohr (born 1930), biologist and science philosopher
 Konrad Rieger (1855–1939), psychiatrist
 Rudolf Schlichter (1890–1955), painter
 Heinz-Wolfgang Schnaufer (1922–1950), Luftwaffe night fighter pilot of World War II
 Ulrich Rülein von Calw (1465–1523), doctor, mathematician, mining engineer, town planner and mayor of Freiberg
 Sascha Goc (born 1979), NHL player who played for the New Jersey Devils and the Tampa Bay Lightning
 Marcel Goc (born 1983), NHL player who played for the San Jose Sharks and Florida Panthers

Twinnings 
  Weida, Thuringia
  Latsch, South Tyrol, Italy

References

External links

Calw (district)
Württemberg